History of magic may refer to:

Magic (illusion)
Magic (supernatural)
Magic in the Greco-Roman world
Medieval European magic
Renaissance magic
Baroque magic
Magick

See also
Christian views on magic
European witchcraft
History of religion
Magic and religion
Shamanism